Eduard Gradoboyev (born 28 September 1971) is a Belarusian association football coach and former player. He spent his entire coaching career in Belshina Bobruisk, working at various positions including youth coach, assistant, and head coach.

Family
Eduard Gradoboyev's twin brother Igor Gradoboyev was also a professional footballer. The brothers spent their entire playing careers alongside each other. Igor died in 2013.

Eduard 's son Dmitriy Gradoboyev also became professional footballer.

Honours
Belshina Bobruisk
Belarusian Premier League champion: 2001
Belarusian Cup winner: 1996–97, 1998–99, 2000–01

References

External links
 

1980 births
Living people
Soviet footballers
Belarusian footballers
Association football midfielders
FC Gomel players
FC Iskra Smolensk players
FC Fandok Bobruisk players
FC Belshina Bobruisk players
Belarusian football managers
FC Belshina Bobruisk managers